Mify are a rock band formed in Leningrad in 1966.

History

1966-1967: The Red Roosters 
The history of the group began in September 1966, when Sergey Danilov and Gennadiy Barikhnovskiy were both eighth-graders at School No. 216 in the Kirovsky District of Leningrad. In the midst of Beatlemania and the popularity of rock and roll, they decided to start their own group. In one of their early performances as a duet, they played music from the film Lyudi nad oblakami at a school event. Soon after, Dmitry Zadvornov, then a freshman, joined the group as a vocalist.

In the summer of 1966, the group was joined by bassist Pyotr “Pete” Bezdudnov, a student of the neighboring School No. 501, and drummer Valeriy Sorokin, a classmate of the group’s founders. Zadvornov suggested naming the group “The Red Roosters” after Willie Dixon's blues standard “Little Red Rooster”, which he knew from The Rolling Stones' rendition. The group's only performance with this name and line-up occurred at School No. 216 on December 29, 1966.

Soon after, Vyacheslav Legzdin replaced Bezdudnov on bass and the group changed their name to Mify. The band's first performance under the new name took place on November 7, 1967.

1967-1974: Early years of Mify 
Before the members graduated from school, the group performed at their own school, School No. 501, and at the Seltso sovkhoz. Drummer Valeriy Sorokin was replaced by Sergey Petrov, who had previously played in a group at School No. 501. Zadvornov left the group and Barikhnovsky took over the vocals.

At the end of 1967, Mify took the second place in a district-wide competition of school ensembles. They went on a city-wide tour and came fourth in that competition. A portion of their performance was played in a radio program dedicated to the competition. The members of Gorizont, the group that won the competition, advised the members of Mify to join the choir at the Pioneers Palace. Danilov, Barikhnovsky and Legzdin followed this advice and learned to sing vocal harmonies. Mify and Gorizont went on to hold several joint performances. 

In the fall of 1968, Mify performed in the competition "Listen to the music of our city" at the Gaza Palace of Culture and were named the winners. This success gave them access to the rehearsal base at the Pioneers Palace, and the group gradually acquired its own equipment. 

In the summer of 1969, Yuri Il'chenko joined the group. The first performance in the updated line-up (Danilov, Barikhnovskiy, Il'chenko, and Petrov) took place in October, in the club of the village of Pargolovo. Mify played at dance parties in Pargolovo and Toksovo, performing the English-language pop-rock standards that were popular at that time. Their repertoire included songs from The Beatles, The Rolling Stones, and others. The group's few original songs at the time included "Ya padayu, padayu", several instrumental compositions, and a couple of English-language sketches. The group's second full-fledged composition, "Sny", appeared later and was written by Barikhnovsky to the words of his friend Vladimir Pokatov.

In early 1970, guitarist and singer Yuri Bushev joined the group. In the same year, Yuri Il'chenko was drafted into the army, and the group was left without a main vocalist. Mify dissolved and the former band members joined VIA acts.

After serving the requisite two years in the army, Il'chenko returned and Mify reformed with new members in 1972. From this point on, the group performed original songs in Russian while remaining a non-professional act. In 1973, Danilov and Barikhnovsky attempted to write and stage their own rock opera, Vremya, about the generation gap. The opera remained unfinished, but some of the songs from it entered the group's repertoire.

At the end of 1973, Sergey Petrov left for the army and Viktor Gukov replaced him as drummer. The group's first success came in January 1974, when Mify shared first place with Evgeny Myasnikov's group Zemlyane — Atlas in a contest of amateur bands in Leningrad, and Sergey Danilov was named the best guitarist. At a contest for amateur bands in Moscow in the same year, Mify performed on equal terms with such groups as Mashina Vremeni and Tsvety, which were already popular at that time. In this competition, Barikhnovskiy was recognized as the best bass player and Il'chenko was recognized as the best vocalist.

1974-1975: Lyudi Levenshteina 
During 1974 the group went through several drummers: Victor Gukov, Andrey “Kuznechik” Alekseev, and Victor Dombrovsky. In the summer of that year, Mify fell apart again as Il'chenko left the group. The members began to perform separately again: Il'chenko worked at the Philharmonic, and Danilov and Barikhnovsky played at dances at the White Hall in Pushkin, in a group led by Vsevolod Levenshtein.

In March 1975, Mify were invited to participate in several concerts in Tallinn. Danilov and Barikhnovsky hastily assembled a touring line-up, with Aleksandr Ivanov from Letuchiy Gollandets on drums and Oleg "Alik" Azarov  from Rossianye on keyboards. The Estonian concerts were considered a great success, and the group took first place in the competition. Following their success in the Tallinn Festival, the group recorded their hit “Madison Street” for Estonian television. The clip was broadcast in the Baltic states.

It was decided to extend the existence Mify for another season, with yet another line-up change. At this point, the group was composed of Barikhnovskiy (bass, vocals), Danilov (guitar, some vocals), Il'chenko (guitar, vocals), Mikhail "Michael" Kordyukov (drums), Vsevolod Levenshtein (saxophone), and Yuri Stepanov (grand piano, vocals).

Levenshtein participated in the group not only as a musician, but also by conducting the group’s affairs, organizing concerts, and performing other production duties. Before joining Mify, Levenshtein had led the VIA Dobry Molodtsy for two years. Mify existed for some time under the unofficial name Lyudi Levenshteina. However, the group only performed under this name once: at a jazz concert organized by jazz expert Grigory Frank, the sound engineer of Leningrad television, in the spring of 1975. For this occasion, Levenshtein invited a couple of familiar professional jazz players to play along with the group. At rare underground concerts, the group performed under its real name. In November 1975, having left Mify, Levenshtein also left the Soviet Union.

1975-1979: Yuri Il'chenko, Mashina Vremeni, and Voskreseniye 
Yuri Il'chenko returned to the group in the autumn of 1975. Mify adopted a jazz-rock sound, introducing a brass section with Oleg Kuvaitsev and Albert Rachkin on saxophone, Yuri Gantsev on trumpet, and Viktor Musorov and Valery Zavarin on trombone. Sergei Petrov also returned, replacing Mikhail Kordyukov, who had left to join Aquarium.

In the spring of 1976, Mify participated the competition for amateur ensembles “Spring Key” in the Gaza Palace of Culture and subsequently toured Moscow, without much success. At around the same time, Mify gave a concert at the Krupskaya Palace of Culture in Leningrad. This concert also marked the debut of the Moscow group Mashina Vremeni on the Leningrad stage, and Mify's set left a strong impression on Andrei Makarevich, the leader of Mashina Vremeni.

A couple of months later, Mashina Vremeni again visited Leningrad. After one concert, Il'chenko decided to join Mashina Vremeni and go back to Moscow with them. For eight months, Il'chenko lived in Andrei Makarevich’s apartment and performed with Mashina Vremeni. Several of Mify's compositions entered Mashina Vremeni's repertoire. In particular, the song “Shock” was later published on the disc Eto bylo tak davno.

During this time, Danilov played with the jazz-rock band Dve Radugi and Petrov played with Yuri Morozov. Barikhnovsky played with his own group in the Leningrad cafe “Surprise”, popular with local music lovers.

In early 1977, Il'chenko returned to Leningrad with the rest of Mashina Vremeni. Il'chenko attempted to organize a new supergroup called Voskreseniye with members of Mify. However, this group did not last long and disbanded after giving several concerts. In the same year, Danilov went to prison on charges of possession and use of drugs, and Mify again dissolved.

Over the next few years, Il'chenko participated in a variety of projects. In 1977, Il'chenko took part in the creation of the Soviet Union's first underground rock magazine Roksi, acting as an editor and journalist. When Mashina Vremeni broke up in the following spring, its members Evgeny Margulis and Sergey Kavagoe decided to call Il'chenko again. Il'chenko saw this as a chance to resurrect his group Voskreseniye, but due to illness, he was not able to take part in the project. The former members of Mashina Vremeni thus formed the Moscow group Voskreseniye. In 1978 Il'chenko recorded an acoustic album Dozhd, which was included in Roksi's unofficial hit parade. At the end of 1979, Il'chenko joined the official pop ensemble Zemlyane, replacing Igor Romanov. Ilchenko remained in Zemlyane for a year before moving on to Integral.

1980-present: Debut album and later tours 
In 1979, Andrei Tropillo had started his underground recording studio AnTrop and decided to begin full-fledged studio recordings of Leningrad rock bands. Tropillo conducted his first studio experiments with Mify's keyboard player, Yuri Stepanov, and Olga Pershina. In 1980, Danilov was released from prison and Mify was revived. The reunited "golden line-up" of Mify (Danilov, Barikhnovsky, Petrov, Stepanov) recorded several of Stepanov's songs at the newly opened studio. This recording, "Proschai, chyornaya subbota", was Tropillo's first serious studio work.

On March 7, 1981, Mify performed at the opening ceremony of the Leningrad Rock Club, alongside Rossianye and Picnic. In the same year, they performed at a festival in the Nevsky Palace of Culture and completed the recording of their debut album Doroga domoi on AnTrop.

In 1983, Mify and Aquarium tied for second place at the first Leningrad rock festival, with Manufaktura taking first place. Mify also received a prize for the anti-war song "Otvetny udar". 

The group continued to perform, with changed line-ups and occasional hiatuses, over the next few decades. As of 2019, Mify were still active.

Band members 
Current line-up:

 Gennadiy Barikhnovskiy — vocals, guitar
 Aleksandr Sokolov — guitar, vocals
 Sergey Pugachyov — bass
 Dmitriy Kalinin — keyboards
 Vladimir Manuylov — saxophone
 Viktor Morozov — drums

At different times, many famous musicians have played with the group.

List of the noteworthy former members:

 Vsevolod (Seva) Levenshtein (Dobry molodtsy, Icarus) — saxophone
 Mikhail "Michael" Kordyukov (Aquarium, Trilistnik) — drums
 Mikkhail Vladimirov (Azart, Chizh & Co)— guitar
 Roman Kaporin (Deti)— saxophone
 Oleg "Alik" Azarov (Rossianye) — grand piano
 Aleksandr Novikov (Lotus) — guitar 
 Dmitry Makoviz (Lotus)— keyboards
 Dmitry Filippov (Lotus)— drums
 Vladimir Gadenov (VIA Sinyaya Ptitsa, Cherry Wine) — bass

Discography 
There are no recordings of Mify from the 1970s, when Yuri Il'chenko led the group.

Tape releases 
 1980 - Proschai, chyornaya subbota (solo album by Yuri Stepanov with the participation of members of Mify)
 1981 - Doroga domoi
 1987 - Mifologiya
 1989 - Bey, kolokol!

Official releases 
 1988 - Madison Street (Melodiya)
 1990 - Bey, kolokol!!! (Melodiya)
 1992 - Vniz golovoy (Cobweb Records)
 1994 - Mifologiya (NP-Records)
 2010 - Chto budet potom... (Bomba-Piter)

References

External links 

 

Musical groups from Saint Petersburg
Musical groups established in 1966
Soviet rock music groups